Barbara Tversky (nee Gans) is a professor emerita of psychology at Stanford University and a professor of psychology and education at Teachers College, Columbia University. Tversky specializes in cognitive psychology.

Education
Tversky received a B.A. in psychology from the University of Michigan in 1963 and a Ph.D. in psychology from the University of Michigan in 1969.

Academic career

Areas of work
She is an authority in the areas of visual-spatial reasoning and collaborative cognition. Tversky’s research interests include language and communication, comprehension of events and narratives, and the mapping and modeling of cognitive processes. She is the author of Mind in Motion: How Action Shapes Thought. Basic Books, 2019.

Academic roles
She has served on the faculty of Stanford University since 1977 and of Teachers College, Columbia University, since 2005.

In addition, Tversky has served on the editorial boards of multiple prominent academic journals, including Psychological Research (1976–1984), the Journal of Experimental Psychology: Learning, Memory and Cognition (1976–1982), the Journal of Experimental Psychology: General (1982–1988), Memory and Cognition (1989–2001), and Cognitive Psychology (1995–2002).

Recognition
Tversky was elected to the American Academy of Arts and Sciences in 2013, named a Fellow of the American Psychological Society in 1995, the Cognitive Science Society in 2002, and the Society of Experimental Psychologists in 2004. In 1999, she received the Phi Beta Kappa Excellence in Teaching Award.

Personal life

Tversky was married to fellow psychologist Amos Tversky (1937–1996) from 1963 until his death in 1996. They had 3 children together.

As of 2021, she lives with the widowed Daniel Kahneman, her late husband's longtime collaborator.

Tversky describes herself as "culturally Jewish", speaks Hebrew, and lived in Jerusalem. She is a fan of opera.

References

External links
 "Barbara Tverksy: An Oral History," Stanford Historical Society Oral History Program, 2018.
 Interview https://www.youtube.com/watch?v=3tKcLo6zU2s

American women psychologists
Columbia University faculty
Teachers College, Columbia University faculty
Scientists from California
University of Michigan College of Literature, Science, and the Arts alumni
Living people
American cognitive psychologists
Fellows of the Cognitive Science Society
Fellows of the American Psychological Association
Fellows of the Society of Experimental Psychologists
Stanford University Department of Psychology faculty
Year of birth missing (living people)
American women academics
21st-century American women scientists